Jim Liddell was an English-Scottish footballer who played in the Hong Kong First Division League for Hong Kong Rangers FC as a goalkeeper between 1973 and 1976.

External links

1953 births
Living people
Association football goalkeepers
Scottish footballers
Hong Kong Rangers FC players
Greenock Morton F.C. players
Hong Kong First Division League players
Scottish Football League players
Scottish expatriate sportspeople in Hong Kong
Scottish expatriate footballers
Expatriate footballers in Hong Kong